Andrew Warren Elsbury (born 7 March 1979) is an Australian former politician who represented the Liberal Party in the Western Metropolitan Region in the Victorian Legislative Council.
Prior to his election to the Parliament of Victoria he was an Advisor to Senator Michael Ronaldson. On 24 November 2014, Elsbury lost his Legislative Council seat to the Democratic Labour Party (Australia) in the 2014 Victorian state election. He quit the Liberal Party in 2022 in protest of its drift toward the religious and far right.Elsbury cited the preselection of far-right candidate Moira Deeming at the top of the Liberal Party’s ticket for the Western Metropolitan Region, describing it as ‘the last straw.’

References

External links
 

1979 births
Living people
Liberal Party of Australia members of the Parliament of Victoria
Members of the Victorian Legislative Council
21st-century Australian politicians